Concordia Lutheran Church is an often-used name for Lutheran congregations.  It may refer to:

Church buildings
 Concordia Lutheran Church (Frohna, Missouri), built in 1839 in the United States
 Concordia German Evangelical Church and Rectory, formerly the Concordia Lutheran Evangelical Church, Washington, D.C., United States

Denominations
 Concordia Lutheran Church (Kyrgyzstan), an unaffiliated Lutheran denomination
 Concordia Lutheran Church (Swedish denomination), a single-congregation Lutheran denomination in Sweden 
 Evangelical Lutheran Church "Concord", a small denomination based in Siberia in Russia
 Lutheran Church of Concord in Mozambique, an unaffiliated Lutheran denomination
 Thailand Concordia Lutheran Church, an unaffiliated Lutheran denomination

See also
 List of Lutheran denominations